Viacheslav Samodurov (born 19 May 1974) is a former Principal dancer of the Royal Ballet, Covent Garden in London. Prior to this, he was a Principal Dancer at the Mariinsky Ballet, St. Petersburg and the Dutch National Ballet, Amsterdam.

Career
Born in Tallinn in Estonia in 1974, Samodurov trained at the Vaganova Academy in St. Petersburg. Viacheslav joined the Mariinsky Ballet's corps de ballet in 1992. In 1996, he became a soloist, and won the 1st Prize at the Maya International Ballet Competition, St. Petersburg. He relocated to the UK to join the Royal Ballet in 2003, and left the company in 2010.

He is artistic director of the Yekaterinburg Ballet Company since 2011/12 season. He choreographed Amore Buffo after L’elisir d’amore by Gaetano Donizetti; Cantus Arcticus to the music of Einojuhani Rautavaara; The Salieri Variations to the music of Antonio Salieri; Colordelic to the music of Pyotr Tchaikovsky, Arvo Pärt and Francis Poulenc; Curtain to the music of Ottorino Respighi; Prokofiev's Romeo & Juliet (revision of the ballet mounted for the Royal Ballet of Flanders in 2014), and The Snow Queen by Artyom Vasiliev.

In 2016 he staged Ondine by Hans Werner Henze at the Bolshoi Theatre.

Selected repertoire
Solor in La Bayadère
Conrad in Le Corsaire
Tchaikovsky Pas de Deux
Prince Désiré in The Sleeping Beauty
Prince Siegfried in Swan Lake
Paris in Romeo and Juliet
The third movement in Symphony in C
Rubies in Jewels
Le jeune homme et la mort

Created roles
Y. Petukhov's Postscriptum
A. Ratmansky's Fairy kiss
A. Ratmansky's Poem of ecstasy

Awards
1996: 1st prize at the Maya International Ballet Competition, St. Petersburg 
2014: Golden Mask for the production of Salieri Variations, 2013
2015: Golden Mask for the production of Colordelic, 2013
2016: the prize «Soul of Dance», Moscow
2020: Golden Mask for the production of The King's order, 2018

See also
List of Russian ballet dancers

References

External links
Vyacheslav Samodurov // Bolshoi Theatre

1974 births
Living people
Russian male ballet dancers
Principal dancers of The Royal Ballet
Mariinsky Ballet principal dancers
People from Tallinn
20th-century Russian ballet dancers
21st-century Russian ballet dancers
Ballet choreographers
Russian choreographers